Gift Atulewa (born 1 April 1986) is a Nigerian football forward currently playing for Warri Wolves F.C.

Career 
He began his career with Bayelsa United F.C. before moving in 2006 to Ocean Boys F.C. After one season, he moved in July 2008 to Warri Wolves F.C.

International career

U-20
He was a member of the Nigeria U-20 team that took part in the 2005 FIFA World Youth Championship in Netherlands in which they were eliminated in the final by Argentina.

Honors 
 2005: FIFA U-20 World Cup runner-up

External links
 Fifa

References 

1986 births
Living people
Nigerian footballers
Nigeria under-20 international footballers
Association football forwards
Warri Wolves F.C. players
Ocean Boys F.C. players